Beachport is a small coastal town in the Australian state of South Australia about  south-east of the state capital of Adelaide and about  north-west of the municipal seat in Millicent, located at the northern end of Rivoli Bay. Beachport has a large crayfishing fleet, and is known for its -long jetty, the second-longest in South Australia after the one at Port Germein. The towns Norfolk pines, white sand beach and alluring clear waters are alluring to visitors 

Prior to European settlement starting in the 1820s, the Bungandidj people from the Mount Gambier region are the early settlers of this area. Archeological evidence shows they have inhabited this area for upwards of 30,000 years. In their language, this area was called Wirmalngrang.

History
Following the discovery and naming of Rivoli Bay in 1802 by French navigator Nicolas Baudin, a whaling station was established there in the 1830s. The whaling industry soon declined, to be followed in succeeding decades by European pastoralists settling in the hinterland. Whaling was then superseded by a booming wool export industry, leading to the need for a port. The town was named on 23 May 1878 for the then British Secretary of State for the Colonies, Michael Hicks Beach, 1st Earl St Aldwyn.

World War II
Beachport is the location of what are believed to be the first casualties of World War II on Australian soil.  On 12 July 1941, a local fisherman discovered and towed to Beachport a German sea mine, laid either by the raider Pinguin or the minelayer Passat.  The following day, two able seamen, Thomas Todd and William Danswan, part of a three-man Rendering Mines Safe (REMS) team, were killed when a wave lifted the mine and caused it to explode on the beach while they were attempting to defuse it. A monument now stands in the town to honour them.

Transport
Beachport was officially proclaimed a port on 21 November 1878.  In the same year a lighthouse was erected close by on Penguin Island and a railway from Mount Gambier was completed. A wool and grain store was built in 1879, served by the railway, thereby providing a facility to link the export trade by rail and sea. The railway closed in 1957. The old wool and grain store has been preserved and today serves as a National Trust museum.

Heritage listings
Beachport has a number of sites listed on the South Australian Heritage Register, including:
 Railway Terrace: Beachport Customs House
 5 Railway Terrace: Wool and Grain Store
 Rivoli Bay: Beachport Jetty

Environment
Popular recreational fishing spots include the Salmon Hole, jetty and 10 Mile Beach. Other attractions include the Salt Lake, Lake George and the rugged coastal views of the Scenic Drive. The nearby Beachport Conservation Park, which includes  of beaches, rocky headlands and boobialla scrub, overlaps with the much larger Lake Hawdon System Important Bird Area. In the sandhills adjacent to Beachport is the Pool of Siloam, named in allusion to the Biblical Pool of Siloam as locals claim it has healing properties similar to the pool in Jerusalem. Said to be seven times saltier than the ocean, it is enjoyed by swimmers and has related amenities.

References

External links

Coastal towns in South Australia
1878 establishments in Australia
Limestone Coast
Populated places established in 1878